Boxing competitions at the 2023 Pan American Games in Santiago, Chile are scheduled to be held between October 21 and 27, 2023 at the La Reina Community Sports Center, located in La Reina.

The competition is split among 13 events, seven for men and six for women. The event will be used as a qualifier for the 2024 Summer Olympics in Paris, France, as the two finalists will secure spots to the Games.

Qualification system

A total of 130 boxers will qualify to compete at the games (ten per event). The host nation (Chile) received automatic qualification spots. The remainder of the spots were awarded through various qualifying tournaments.

Participating nations
A total of 10 countries qualified athletes so far.

Medal summary

Medallists
Men

Women

See also
Boxing at the 2024 Summer Olympics

References

 
Boxing
Pan American Games
2023